Łukaszewski is a Polish surname. It comes from the given name Łukasz (Lucas).

16090 Lukaszewski, a comet
David Lukaszewski, American poker player
Ewelina Lukaszewska, Polish actress
James Lukaszewski, American crisis management consultant
Paweł Łukaszewski, Polish composer
Jerzy Łukaszewski, Polish diplomat
Marcin Łukaszewski, Polish footballer
Marcin Łukaszewski (musician)|Marcin Łukaszewski]], Polish composer
Wiesław Łukaszewski, Polish psychologists
Witold Łukaszewski, Polish guitarist
Wojciech Łukaszewski, Polish composer
Ashley Lukashevsky, American illustrator

Polish-language surnames